Andre Ricks (born September 12, 1986) is a former NCAA Division I basketball player.

Early life 
Andre Ricks was born in Detroit, Michigan and is the son of Maxine Ricks and Daniel Paul. Andre comes from a legendary boxing family which includes his father Danny "MadDog" Paul who won the Olympics and Golden Gloves in 1978 representing legendary Kronk boxing team, uncle seven-time World Champion Thomas "Hitman" Hearns , and IBF World Champion Jimmy “The RingMaster” Paul.

March 2001 Andre made a guest appearance playing against  AND-1 Streetball Live Tour at Calihan Hall where he quickly earned a name for himself as “The Seatbelt”. Andre Ricks starred at Detroit Pershing High School where he led Pershing to a 23–6 record as a senior as one of several NCAA Division I recruits on the team. He averaged 18.3 points, 6.0 assists and 4.0 steals and averaged 16.0 points, 5.0 assists and 3.0 steals per outing as a junior.

Ricks played in Detroit all-star game and was named all-state in 2005. He was named third best point guard in the state by Prep Spotlight, Detroit News and Detroit Free Press. Ricks was ranked top ball handler in the state of Michigan by Prep Spotlight Magazine and ranked one of the top players in the state regardless of class by Rivals.com and Scout.com.

Ricks verbally committed to Western Michigan University as a sophomore in high school, making him the youngest basketball player to commit ever in Western Michigan History after only playing a year and a half of high school basketball.

College career 

Ricks played four years at Western Michigan University. In 2007 Ricks was ranked fifth in the Mid-American Conference in three-point shooting for all games.
In 2006 during the Western Michigan University Men's Basketball European Tour in Athens, Greece Ricks logged in his first career double-double with 22 points, 12 assist and 6 steals vs. Greek U National Team.
In 2007 Ricks scored 10 points and had 4 assist against #11 Ranked Oregon Ducks.  Andre Ricks also played a key role in Western Michigan's MAC West division championship.
In December 2007 Ricks was named MAC West Player of the Week and CollegeInsider.com Mid-Major Player of the Week after scoring a career-high 29 points against unbeaten San Diego State University which was coached by hall of fame Coach Steve Fisher.

In 2008, Ricks crossover move against Virginia Tech University was selected by ESPN SportsCenter's Top 10 Plays coming in at number 5.

Ricks scored 10 points in 104 seconds on his way to 16 points in a nationally televised game on ESPN2 vs. Marist College and finished in a tie for 12th in scoring 38 points at the Old Spice Classic.

2008 Ricks made his tenth career start vs Temple University, Ricks scored 14 points and had 4 assist.  Aundrey Ricks scored 15 points in the second half in the victory over Pepperdine University.

Despite Ricks' performance on the court he battled a torn ligament in his left wrist during summer workouts which caused him to miss numerous of games during the 2008–2009 season.

Ricks holds a Bachelor's Degree from Western Michigan University. In 2021, Ricks was accepted into Arizona State University Walter Cronkite School of Journalism and Mass Communication Graduate Program.

Professional career

Basketball 
In 2009, Andre Ricks was selected as camp director of the Detroit Pistons youth basketball camp held at the Palace of Auburn Hills (home of the Pistons.).
During the summer of 2011 Ricks coached the Adidas youth Basketball camp in Rome, Italy.

Started From Scratch: 10 Principles to Success A Memoir By Andre Ricks 
In 2020, Andre Ricks published his first book Started From Scratch: 10 Principles to Success, A Memoir. Ricks book provides the reader with 10 Principles to Success explained in chronological order using his life experiences to drive the message home. Ricks book is available at Barnes & Noble.

Awards and recognition 
Ricks has been active at fundraisers and charity events. The City of Kalamazoo Council Members recognized Ricks for his youth mentor program in 2007.

In March 2011, Ricks Business Rawimpact was named newcomer business of The Year by the Kalamazoo, Gazette and Western Herald for his sports memorabilia flagship store Downtown, Kalamazoo, MI.

In April 2012, Ricks and his brand Rawimpact was recognized by Western Michigan University and the National Pan-Hellenic Council for sponsoring campus-wide festival that had record breaking numbers with student attendance.

See also 
 2007–08 Western Michigan Broncos men's basketball team
 Western Michigan Broncos men's basketball

References

External links 

Living people
American men's basketball players
Basketball players from Detroit
Western Michigan University alumni
Western Michigan Broncos men's basketball players
1986 births